The 2014 BRDC Formula 4 Championship was a multi-event motor racing championship for open wheel, formula racing cars held across England. The championship featured a mix of professional motor racing teams and privately funded drivers competing in 2 litre Duratec single seat race cars that conformed to the technical regulations for the championship. The 2014 season was the second BRDC Formula 4 Championship organized by Jonathan Palmer's MotorSport Vision company, with support from the British Racing Drivers' Club in the United Kingdom, and dedicated championship highlights shown on ITV4 the weekend after each round, in a prime time slot. The season began at Silverstone on 26 April and ended on 26 October at Snetterton, after 8 triple header events amassing to 24 races.

Heading into the final round of the championship, six drivers were in mathematical contention to win the championship. Lanan Racing team-mates Arjun Maini and George Russell led the standings, with Maini 21 points clear of Russell. HHC Motorsport duo Sennan Fielding and Raoul Hyman were split by five points for third and fourth places, with Struan Moore (Lanan Racing) and Will Palmer (HHC Motorsport) requiring results to go in their favour, despite being in the running. Russell took pole position for the opening race, but Fielding was the highest placed at the end, in third place; Russell cut Maini's lead slightly with a seventh, while Palmer and Moore could no longer win the title due to their results. Maini took pole for the second race, due to his eighth place and the regulations for the partially reversed grid order stipulating such. Maini led from the start, before Hyman and Russell passed him early in the race. Maini fell to fifth as he made an error later in the race, dropping him behind Fielding and Moore. Hyman held the lead until the end which meant that four drivers could still win the title in the final race.

Maini held a 13-point lead over Russell, with Fielding 5 points further adrift, and Hyman the outsider, 25 points adrift of Maini. Russell started from pole position, with Hyman, Fielding and Maini behind. Hyman made the best start to take the lead from Russell at the start, but Russell regained the lead the following lap, and ultimately went on to win the race; a season-high fifth victory. With Maini down in fifth place, it enabled Russell to clinch the title by just three points. With the championship, he received a prize test with the Arden Motorsport GP3 team at the Yas Marina Circuit in Abu Dhabi at the end of the season, as well as a £25,000 cash prize. Behind Maini, Hyman's second place finish allowed him to jump Fielding for third place in the championship, by a single point. All three drivers won four races over the course of the season, including a hat-trick for Fielding at Silverstone, a first for the series. Other drivers to win races were Moore at Oulton Park, Palmer won twice at the first Snetterton meeting, as well as single victories for Diego Menchaca (Snetterton), and Brands Hatch victories for Gustavo Lima, Gaetano di Mauro and Chris Middlehurst.

Teams and drivers

Race calendar and results
The first Brands Hatch race weekend was held in support of the Blancpain Sprint Series. Later in the season, at the first Snetterton meeting and the second Brands Hatch meeting, the series formed part of the support package to British GT Championship rounds.

Championship standings
Scoring system
Points were awarded to the top 20 classified finishers in all races.

Drivers' championship

Jack Cavill Pole Position Cup
The Jack Cavill Pole Position Cup was awarded to the driver who started from pole position most often throughout the season. Champion George Russell won the trophy, on a tie-break with Arjun Maini, as Russell took more pole positions from qualifying sessions.

References

External links
 

BRDC British Formula 3 Championship seasons
BRDC Formula 4
BRDC Formula 4